Soothrakkaari is a 1978 Indian Malayalam film, directed by Rochy Alex. The film stars Vincent, Jayan, Jose, Sukumaran and Unnimary in the lead roles. The film has musical score by A. T. Ummer.

Cast
Vincent
Jayan
Jose
Sukumaran
Seema
Unnimary
Sukumari
T. P. Madhavan
Prathapachandran
Manavalan Joseph

Soundtrack
The music was composed by A. T. Ummer and the lyrics were written by Bichu Thirumala.

References

External links
 

1978 films
1970s Malayalam-language films
Films scored by A. T. Ummer